The Mace-Trefethen M-101 Macerschmitt, also called the Could-Bee, is a single place homebuilt aircraft design built in the late 1950s.

Design
The M-101 is a single-place, strut-braced, tapered mid-wing, conventional landing gear equipped aircraft. Entrance is through a sliding canopy. Brake components were adapted from a Cessna 310 and a Piper Cub.

Operational history
The M-101 was test flown on 15, July 1959 at Sacramento Municipal Airport.

Specifications (Mace-Trefethen M-101 Macerschmitt)

References

Homebuilt aircraft